Neno is a district in the Southern Region of Malawi. The district has a 2016 population of approximately 158,000. District Mwanza in 2003 was split into two districts, Neno and Mwanza, under the decentralisation program.

Demographics
At the time of the 2018 Census of Malawi, the distribution of the population of Neno District by ethnic group was as follows:
 66.4% Ngoni
 13.1% Lomwe
 9.6% Chewa
 4.8% Mang'anja
 2.1% Yao
 2.0% Sena
 0.5% Tumbuka
 0.2% Nyanja
 0.1% Tonga
 0.1% Nkhonde
 0.1% Lambya
 0.0% Sukwa
 1.0% Others

Government and administrative divisions

There are two National Assembly constituencies in Neno:

 Neno - North
 Neno - South

Since the 2009 election both constituencies have been held by members of the Democratic Progressive Party.

References

Districts of Malawi
Districts in Southern Region, Malawi